Edna Davies (1905–1969) was a British stage and film actress.

Selected filmography
 The Hate Ship (1929)
 Spanish Eyes (1930)
 Song of Soho (1930)
 Loose Ends (1930)
 Sometimes Good (1934)
 Side Street Angel (1937)

Theatre
She was a member of the original London performance cast of Arnold Ridley's The Ghost Train in 1925.

References

External links
 

1905 births
1969 deaths
Welsh film actresses
People from Newport, Wales
Welsh stage actresses
20th-century British actresses